Events during the year 1956 in Northern Ireland.

Incumbents
 Governor - 	The Lord Wakehurst 
 Prime Minister - Basil Brooke

Events
12 December – The Irish Republican Army launches its Border Campaign with the bombing of a BBC relay transmitter in County Londonderry, burning of a courthouse in Magherafelt by a unit led by 18-year-old Seamus Costello and of an Ulster Special Constabulary post near Newry and blowing up of a half-built British Army barracks at Enniskillen. A raid on Gough Barracks in Armagh is beaten off after a brief exchange of fire.
14 December – Border Campaign: An IRA column under Seán Garland detonates bombs outside Lisnaskea Royal Ulster Constabulary station before raking it with gunfire. Further attacks on Derrylin and Roslea RUC barracks are beaten off.
21 December – The Government of Northern Ireland under Basil Brooke uses the Special Powers Act to intern several hundred republican suspects without trial.
30 December – Border Campaign: The IRA Teeling Column under Noel Kavanagh again attacks the Derrylin RUC barracks, killing constable John Scally, the campaign's first fatality.
Ulster Protestant Action, a loyalist Protestant fundamentalist vigilante group, is founded at a special meeting at the Ulster Unionist Party's offices in Glengall Street, Belfast.
Tayto (Northern Ireland) established by the Hutchinson family to manufacture potato chips at Tandragee, County Armagh.

Arts and literature
23 April – Belfast-born author C. S. Lewis and American poet Joy Gresham have a civil marriage at Oxford register office.

Sport

Football
Irish League
Winners: Linfield

Irish Cup
Winners: Distillery 2 - 2, 0 - 0, 1 - 0 Glentoran

Births
14 January – Ronan Bennett, novelist and screenwriter.
5 February – Jackie Woodburne, actress.
15 April – Christopher Dye, Coordinator of Tuberculosis Monitoring and Evaluation at the World Health Organization and Gresham Professor of Physic.
7 May – David Catherwood, composer and conductor.
24 May – Michael Jackson, Anglican Bishop of Clogher (2002 - ).
2 September – Angelo Fusco, volunteer in the Provisional Irish Republican Army and escapee.
3 September – Pat McGeown, volunteer in the Provisional Irish Republican Army, participant in the 1981 Irish hunger strike (died 1996).
13 September – Bobby Campbell, footballer.
19 September – Gerry McElhinney, footballer.
10 October – Amanda Burton, actress.
18 November – Noel Brotherston, footballer (died 1995).

Full date unknown
Don Mullan, writer and film producer.
Bobby Storey, Provisional Irish Republican Army activist and Sinn Féin politician (died 2020).

Deaths
20 February – James Cousins, poet and writer (born 1873).
18 March – Benjamin Glazer, Academy Award-winning writer, producer and director (born 1887).
23 July – Ella Young, poet (born 1867).
5 August – J. M. Andrews, second Prime Minister of Northern Ireland (born 1871).
25 November – Robert Bruce Bowers, cricketer (born 1897).

See also
1956 in Scotland
1956 in Wales

References